The 2020–21 season is Pallacanestro Cantù's 84th in existence and the club's 25th consecutive season in the top tier Italian basketball.

Overview

Kit 
Supplier: EYE Sport Wear / Sponsor: S.Bernardo

Players

Current roster

Depth chart

Squad changes

In

|}

Out

|}

Confirmed 

|}

Coach

Competitions

Supercup

Serie A

See also 

 2020–21 LBA season
 2020 Italian Basketball Supercup

References 

2020–21 in Italian basketball by club